Mount Paige is a mountain 3 nautical miles (6 km) west of Mount Carbone, and 6 nautical miles east of Mount June, in the Phillips Mountains, Marie Byrd Land, Antarctica. Its elevation is just over 1000 m and it has the appearance of a mesa with a flattened top tilted south.  Discovered and mapped from air photos taken by the Byrd Antarctic Expedition (1928–30). Named by Advisory Committee on Antarctic Names (US-ACAN) for David Paige, artist with the Byrd Antarctic Expedition (1933–35).

References

Mountains of Marie Byrd Land